The Don gudgeon (Gobio brevicirris) is a species of gudgeon, a small freshwater in the family Cyprinidae. It is widespread in Europe in the Don River system in Russia and Ukraine. It is a freshwater demersal fish, up to 10 cm long.

References

Gobio
Fish described in 1976
Cyprinid fish of Europe
Fish of Russia
Fauna of Ukraine